The Jewel class is a class of cruise ships operated by the Norwegian Cruise Line (NCL) and was built by Meyer Werft of Germany. The lead ship,  was delivered in August 2005 and the last vessel,  was delivered in October 2007; however, the second ship of the class  (originally built as Pride of Hawaii) was originally intended for NCL America. After sailing for the line in two years (2006–2008), Pride of Hawaii proved to be unsuccessful. In 2008, NCL decided to transfer Pride of Hawaii to their fleet. After receiving her current NCL livery, she was renamed Norwegian Jade and sailed for NCL in 2008.

Overview 
The Jewel class are the fourth largest ships in the NCL fleet, being preceded by the near-identical Dawn class, and is surpassed by the 153,000 GT Norwegian Epic. These ships have Panamax dimensions, enabling them to transit through the original Panama Canal locks.

These ships are the second batch of ships to have hull art, reflecting the name of each ship.

History 

Norwegian Jewel and Pride of Hawaii were ordered initially and a further two ships, Norwegian Pearl and Norwegian Gem followed in 2004.

Pride of Hawaii, was the second of the four Jewel-class ships ordered by NCL to become an additional ship for NCL America. As the Pride of Hawaii proved unsuccessful in NCL America's fleet, it was decided that she will be transferred to NCL in 2008 and was renamed Norwegian Jade.

Concept and construction

The Jewel class was ordered in September 2003, with an option for two vessels. Later, the option was extended to four vessels. Jewel-class ships have Panamax dimensions, Azipod propulsors and tonnage values of 93,500 GT. The keel of the lead vessel, Norwegian Jewel was laid on 4 June 2004 and was delivered on 4 August 2005; the keel of second vessel, Norwegian Jade (former Pride of Hawaii) was laid on 8 February 2005 and was delivered on 19 April 2006; the third vessel's keel, Norwegian Pearl was laid on 4 October 2005 and was delivered on 28 November 2006; the last vessel's keel, Norwegian Gem was laid on 17 June 2006 and was delivered on 1 October 2007.

Data
 Tonnage: 93,500-GT
 Length: 294 meters
 Width: 32.2 meters
 Decks: 15
 Builder: Meyer Werft
 Notes: Panamax form factor

Ships

References

External links
 Norwegian Cruise Line main page

Cruise ship classes